Francis John Minton (25 December 1917 – 20 January 1957) was an English painter, illustrator, stage designer and teacher. After studying in France, he became a teacher in London, and at the same time maintained a consistently large output of works. In addition to landscapes, portraits and other paintings, some of them on an unusually large scale, he built up a reputation as an illustrator of books.

In the mid-1950s, Minton found himself out of sympathy with the abstract trend that was then becoming fashionable, and felt increasingly sidelined. He suffered psychological problems, self-medicated with alcohol, and in 1957 died by suicide.

Life and career

Early years
Minton was born in Great Shelford, Cambridgeshire, the second of three sons of Francis Minton, a solicitor, and his wife, Kate, née Webb. From 1925 to 1932, he was educated at Northcliff House, Bognor Regis, Sussex, and then from 1932 to 1935 at Reading School. He studied art at St John's Wood School of Art from 1935 to 1938 and was greatly influenced by his fellow student Michael Ayrton, who enthused him with the work of French neo-romantic painters. He spent eight months studying in France, frequently accompanied by Ayrton, and returned from Paris when the Second World War began.

In October 1939 Minton registered as a conscientious objector, but in 1941 changed his views and joined the Pioneer Corps. He was commissioned in the Oxfordshire and Buckinghamshire Light Infantry in 1943, but was discharged on medical grounds in the same year. While in the army, Minton, with Ayrton, designed the costumes and scenery for John Gielgud's 1942 production of Macbeth. The settings moved the piece from the 11th century to "the age of illuminated missals"; The Manchester Guardian wrote that they "should be long remembered". In the same year he and Ayrton held a joint exhibition at the Leicester Galleries in London. The Times wrote, "Mr. Minton is seen to have an overcast, gloomy realism, and much intensity of feeling, which he expresses in dark colour schemes, both in a curious and effective self-portrait and in paintings of streets and bombed buildings."<ref>"Young Artists – Exhibition at Leicester Galleries", The Times, 16 October 1942, p. 6</ref> Minton's early penchant for dark colour schemes can be seen in his 1939 Landscape at Les Baux, in the Tate Gallery.

Teacher, painter and illustrator
From 1943 to 1946 Minton taught illustration at the Camberwell College of Arts, and from 1946 to 1948 he was in charge of drawing and illustration at the Central School of Art and Design.  At the same time he continued to draw and paint, sharing a studio for some years with Robert Colquhoun and Robert MacBryde, and later with Keith Vaughan. Reviewing a 1944 exhibition, The Times remarked that Minton was clearly in the tradition of Samuel Palmer, something frequently remarked on by later critics. Minton's output was considerable. Between 1945 and 1956 he had seven solo exhibitions at the Lefevre Gallery, notwithstanding his work as tutor to the painting school of the Royal College of Art in 1949, a post that he held until the year before his death. Minton's appearance in this period is shown in a 1952 portrait by Lucian Freud, as well as in self-portraits. In the 1940s he, Freud and fellow artist Adrian Ryan had been in a homosexual love triangle.

Minton's range was wide. Although he is best remembered as an illustrator, he also worked on a very large scale, with unusually big paintings for  the Dome of Discovery at the Festival of Britain and "two vast set-pieces" for the Royal College of Art, and at the Royal Academy a huge painting of the soldiers dicing for the garment of Jesus, described by The Manchester Guardian as "one of the most elaborate and serious paintings with a religious theme produced since the war."

He designed textiles and wallpapers; he produced posters for London Transport and Ealing Studios; and he was highly regarded as a portrait painter. He also worked in collage. He painted scenes of Britain, from rural beauty to urban decay, and travelled overseas, producing scenes of the West Indies, Spain and Morocco. The Times wrote, "Even when they were ostensibly of Spain and Jamaica, Minton's landscapes looked back to Samuel Palmer for their mood. They were densely patterned and luxuriantly coloured, and it was always the fullness and richness of the scene which attracted his eye and which he painted with such evident enjoyment."

Minton's posthumous fame is principally as an illustrator. Many of his commissions for illustrations came from the publisher John Lehmann. Both men were homosexual, and they were so much in one another's company that some people supposed that they were partners, though the biographer Artemis Cooper thinks it unlikely. For Lehmann, Minton illustrated A Book of Mediterranean Food and French Country Cooking (the first two books by the food writer Elizabeth David), travel books such as Time was Away – A Notebook in Corsica, by Alan Ross, and fiction, including Treasure Island by Robert Louis Stevenson. He also produced dustwrappers for many publishers including Michael Joseph, Secker and Warburg and Rupert Hart-Davis. One such notable book jacket was for H. E. Bates The Country Heart (Michael Joseph 1949).

Although Minton was respected both by the conservative Royal Academy and the modernist London Group, he was out of sympathy with the abstract painting that began to prevail during the 1950s, and he felt increasingly out of touch with current fashion. He suffered extreme mood swings and became dependent on alcohol. In 1957, he took an overdose of sleeping tablets to take his own life at home, 9 Apollo Place, Chelsea, London, and died on the way to St Stephen's Hospital, Chelsea. He left an estate valued at £13,518.

Memorials
A major exhibition to mark Minton's centenary took place at Pallant House Gallery in Chichester from 1 July to 1 October 2017, co-curated by the Gallery's Director Simon Martin and Minton's biographer Frances Spalding, and is the first exhibition in a museum since the 1994 touring Select Retrospective.

Minton was the subject of the song "The Ghost of Mr. Minton" by London-based pop group Would-Be-Goods on their 2008 album Eventyr. A quote from Minton, "We're all awash in a sea of blood, and the least we can do is wave to each other" inspired the title of the Van der Graaf Generator album The Least We Can Do Is Wave to Each Other.

In the Oxford Dictionary of National Biography's entry on Minton, Michael Middleton writes:

References

Further reading
 
 
 (Reprint 2005 as John Minton: Dance till the stars come down) Lund Humphries)
 
 Rigby Graham, 'John Minton as a Book Illustrator', in The Private Library; 2nd series 1:1 (1968 Spring), p. 7-36
 John Lewis, 'Book Illustrations by John Minton', in Image''; 1 (1949 Summer), p. 51-62

External links
 

1917 births
1957 suicides
20th-century English painters
Academics of Camberwell College of Arts
Academics of the Central School of Art and Design
Alumni of St John's Wood Art School
Painters who committed suicide
English conscientious objectors
English illustrators
English male painters
English gay artists
Landscape artists
English LGBT painters
Gay painters
Suicides in Chelsea
People educated at Reading School
People from Great Shelford
British Army personnel of World War II
Royal Pioneer Corps soldiers
Oxfordshire and Buckinghamshire Light Infantry officers
20th-century English LGBT people
Drug-related suicides in England
20th-century English male artists